Something to Sing About is a 2000 American Christian drama film directed by Charlie Jordan, and starring Irma P. Hall, Darius McCrary, Kirk Franklin, Tamera Mowry, Rashaan Nall, and Helen Martin (in her final film appearance). It was produced by John Shepherd of World Wide Pictures. The storyline revolves around a young man, Tommy, an ex-convict who is trying to make a more fulfilling life for himself. It was the last film appearance for theater, film and television actress Helen Martin.

Plot 
The film opens as Tommy, Darius McCrary, is reading a newspaper, trying to find a job. He eventually finds God and acceptance with help from people around who care.

Films about evangelicalism
2000 drama films
2000 films
2000s English-language films

de:Something to Sing About